Cyperus aquatilis is a sedge of the family Cyperaceae that is native to Australia and New Guinea.

The plant blooms between April and August producing green-brown flowers.

In Western Australia it is found around creeks and swamps in the Kimberley region where it grows in sandy-loamy soils often around laterite.

See also
List of Cyperus species

References

Plants described in 1810
aquatilis
Taxa named by Robert Brown (botanist, born 1773)
Flora of Western Australia
Flora of Queensland
Flora of New Guinea
Flora of the Northern Territory
Flora of New South Wales